The Phillip Rehkopf House is a private house located at 918 Howard Street in Petoskey, Michigan. It was placed on the National Register of Historic Places in 1986.

The Phillip Rehkopf House is a -story brick Queen Anne structure on a stone basement. It has an L-shaped plan, with the gabled short leg of the L extending toward the front. The gables are clad with wooden shingles. Gabled dormers pierce the roof, as does a small tower with an onion-like dome at one end of the facade. A single story porch supported by Doric columns runs across the facade; the porch and the house itself have classical cornices.

It is likely that Phillip Rehkopf, a mason, built this house himself some time before the turn of the century. Phillip's wife Jane ran a rooming house here for many years.

References

Houses on the National Register of Historic Places in Michigan
Queen Anne architecture in Michigan
Emmet County, Michigan